Cistus laurifolius, commonly called laurel-leaf cistus, laurel-leaved cistus or laurel-leaved rock rose, is a species of highly branched flowering evergreen shrub native to some areas around the Mediterranean.

Description
The branches are strong and erect, with reddish bark that is easily removed in strips. The flowering occurs in late spring (May–June), later than most rockroses. It bears white flowers with a yellow spot at the base of each petal, of 4.5–5 cm diameter It is widely cultivated in gardens, and has gained the Royal Horticultural Society's Award of Garden Merit.

Distribution and habitat 
Cistus laurifolius has a disjunct natural distribution throughout the Mediterranean Basin, being found west in Morocco, Iberia (Portugal, Spain), avoiding the wetter climate in the northwest, southern France, Corsica and Tuscany (Italy), and east in Greece and Anatolia.

With the general warming of the atmosphere and the consequent withdrawal of glacial ice, flora surviving from Tertiary times could not re-establish their range in southern Europe; the new post-glacial climate was drier than that of the Tertiary. The original tropical European flora evolved into the present Mediterranean sclerophyll flora. The distribution of some surviving species, such as Cistus laurifolius, shifted to wetter areas, such as the mountains. Due to this, C. laurifolius is named in Spanish in its distribution area as "mountain rockrose", although in the moister coastal west and northwest Iberian Peninsula, it is found at sea level.

Cistus shrubland, including C. laurifolius, resprouts after fire and has seeds that germinate after fires.

Phylogeny
Cistus laurifolius belongs to the white and whitish pink flowered clade of Cistus species.

Gallery

Subtaxa
Cistus laurifolius var. atlanticus Pit.
Cistus laurifolius var. lanceolatus Rouy & Foucaud
Cistus laurifolius var. laurifolius
Cistus laurifolius var. ovatus Rouy & Foucaud

References

laurifolius